Srirampur may refer to:
 Srirampur, Bangladesh
 Srirampur, Burdwan
 Srirampur, Mysore
 Serampore, India